Peace and Noise is the seventh studio album by Patti Smith, released on September 30, 1997 by Arista Records.

Critical reception

Peace and Noise received generally favorable reviews from critics, ranking No. 29 in The Village Voices 1997 Pazz & Jop poll. Uncut magazine ranked the album 21st in its list of the top 25 albums of 1997.

The single "1959" was nominated for Best Female Rock Vocal Performance at the 40th Annual Grammy Awards.

Track listing

Personnel
Band
 Patti Smith – vocals, clarinet
 Lenny Kaye – guitar, pedal steel
 Jay Dee Daugherty – drums, organ, harmonica
 Oliver Ray – guitar, photography
 Tony Shanahan – bass, piano

Additional personnel
 Mark Burdett – art direction
 Michael Stipe – background vocal
 Roy Cicala – engineering, mixing

Charts

References

External links
 
 Peace and Noise at Sony BMG

1997 albums
Arista Records albums
Patti Smith albums